Bessie, otherwise known as Gquma, was a South African traditional aristocrat. As the Great Wife of Paramount Chief Sango of the Tshomane,  she served as a queen of the Mpondo people.

Life
A famous figure in South African history, Bessie was a white girl that was adopted by a local clan following a shipwreck that cast her upon their shores in the 1700s. Her adoptive family - the AbeLungu - had themselves previously acculturated into the local tribes of the Wild Coast region of South Africa after similar misfortunes had befallen them.

Upon coming of age, she married Tshomane, paramount chief of the Mpondo clan whose name he shared. When he died a short time later, she married his successor Sango.

She was ruling as his consort when the merchant vessel The Grosvenor ran aground on the shore of their territory about 40 years after her own ship did the same. At least one of its passengers is thought to have joined the Tshomanes, possibly through the influence of Bessie.

Bessie was a popular ruler of her husband's people, weighty in counsel and deep in feeling. Upon her death, she was one of the few women of the tribe to receive an ancestral praise name.

Descendants
Bessie left behind a large family of descendants. These descendants went on to create a far-flung dynasty that now includes everything from Mpondo, Xhosa and Thembu royalty to old Afrikaner and Coloured families.

See also
History of South Africa
Krotoa

References

Shipwreck survivors
Monarchs of South Africa